Kanji (written: , ,  , , ,  or ) is a masculine Japanese given name. Notable people with the name include:

, Japanese sprinter
, Japanese actor
, Japanese actor and singer
, Japanese general
, Japanese sport shooter
, Japanese academic
, Japanese footballer
, Japanese sport wrestler
, Japanese voice actor
, Japanese actor

Fictional characters
, a character in the video game Persona 4
Kanji Koganegawa (黄金川 貫至), a character from the manga and anime Haikyu!! with the position of setter from Date Tech High

Japanese masculine given names